The 2017 NBA playoffs was the postseason tournament of the 2016-17 NBA season, which began on April 15, 2017 and concluded on June 12, 2017. It concluded with the Golden State Warriors defeating the Cleveland Cavaliers 4 games to 1 in the NBA Finals, their third consecutive meeting in the Finals. Kevin Durant was named the NBA Finals MVP in his first year on the team.

The Warriors set the record for the longest playoff winning streak (15) and the best record (16–1) in NBA playoff history.

Overview

Western Conference
 The Golden State Warriors clinched the best record in the league for 3rd straight season and entered their fifth consecutive postseason for the first time since making six straight appearances from 1947–52'.
 The San Antonio Spurs entered their 20th consecutive postseason, including back-to-back 60+ wins for the first time in franchise history. However, they were swept by the Golden State Warriors in the Conference Finals after Kawhi Leonard’s ankle injury in Game 1, forcing him to miss the rest of the series.
 The Houston Rockets entered their fifth consecutive postseason. However, they were eliminated by the San Antonio Spurs in the Conference Semifinals.
 The Los Angeles Clippers entered their franchise record sixth consecutive postseason. However, they were eliminated by the Utah Jazz in the first round.
 The Utah Jazz clinched the playoffs spot for the first time since 2012 and their first playoffs series win since 2010. However, they were swept by the Golden State Warriors in the Conference Semifinals.
 The Oklahoma City Thunder entered their 2nd consecutive postseason. However, they were eliminated by the Houston Rockets in the first round, their earliest exit since 2010.
 The Memphis Grizzlies entered their seventh consecutive postseason. However, they were eliminated by the San Antonio Spurs in the first round for the second straight year.
 The Portland Trail Blazers entered their fourth consecutive postseason. However, they were swept by Golden State Warriors in the first round.

Eastern Conference
 The Boston Celtics entered their third consecutive postseason and clinched the best record in the Eastern Conference for the first time since 2008. However, they were eliminated by the Cleveland Cavaliers in the Conference Finals.
 The defending champions Cleveland Cavaliers entered their third consecutive postseason. However, they were defeated by the Golden State Warriors in the NBA Finals.
 The Toronto Raptors entered their fourth consecutive postseason, including back-to-back 50+ wins for the first time in franchise history. However, they were swept by the Cleveland Cavaliers in the Conference Semifinals.
 The Washington Wizards, Milwaukee Bucks & Chicago Bulls clinched a playoff spot for the first time since 2015. Milwaukee and Chicago were eliminated by Toronto and Boston, respectively. The Washington Wizards were eliminated by the Boston Celtics in the Conference Semifinals. It should also be noted that Game 6 of the Wizards-Celtics game was the last time before Verizon Center renames to Capital One Arena.
 The Atlanta Hawks entered their 10th consecutive postseason, one shy of their postseason streak of 11 (1963–73). However, they were eliminated by the Washington Wizards in the first round.
 The Indiana Pacers entered their second consecutive postseason. However, they were swept by the Cleveland Cavaliers in the first round.
 With a 4th seed in the playoffs, the Wizards had their highest seed under a 16-team playoff format.

First round
 This was the first time, in a best-of-7 series, that an 8th seed (Chicago Bulls) went up 2–0 against a 1st seed (Boston Celtics) in the first round. It is the second time this happened overall; the Los Angeles Lakers did it against the Phoenix Suns in 1993, which was a best-of-five series that Phoenix eventually won 3 games to 2.
 Cleveland became the first team in playoffs history to come back from a 25-point halftime deficit and win when they beat the Pacers in Game 3.
 The Cavaliers became the first team to sweep an opponent while giving up 100+ points every game since the Houston Rockets allowed 100+ in all 4 games during their sweep of the Orlando Magic in the 1995 NBA Finals.
 The Boston Celtics became the 19th team to come back after trailing 2–0, against the Bulls.  They were also the 4th team in NBA history to lose the first two games of a best-of-7 series at home and still win the series.
 Game 7 between the Los Angeles Clippers and Utah Jazz ensured an 18th-straight postseason in which at least one Game 7 was played; 1999 was the last postseason to not feature a Game 7.
 The Clippers became the first NBA team to blow five straight postseason series leads.
 It was the first series win for the Toronto Raptors where they didn't need all the games of the series. Previously they had beaten the Knicks in 2001 in a best of 5 in five games. In 2016 their two series wins were obtained in seven games each.

Conference semifinals
 The Houston Rockets are the first team to open their series with a blowout only to get blown out in the second game.
 Trailing by 14 and 13 in Games 1 and 2 respectively, the Boston Celtics became the first team to come back and win back-to-back games after trailing by double digits in the first quarter.
 The 27-point loss in Game 1 is San Antonio's largest defeat in a postseason home game.
 Scoring 125 points in a Game 2 blowout victory against the Toronto Raptors, the Cleveland Cavaliers set a franchise record for most points scored in a postseason game. Their previous record was 124, in 2010.
 18 of 21 conference semifinals games were decided by 10 points or more. Eight of these games were decided by over 20 points.
 With a four-game sweep against the Raptors, the Cleveland Cavaliers became the second team to have six playoffs series sweeps in three consecutive postseasons (2015–2017) since the Lakers did it in 1987–1989. They also became the first team to start 8–0 in two straight playoffs.
 The Cavaliers' Game 4 win over the Raptors gave them their 11th consecutive postseason win (a streak dating back to Game 5 of the 2016 NBA Finals), setting a franchise record.
 With a four-game sweep against Utah, Golden State swept consecutive playoff series for the first time in franchise history and also had their best eight-game postseason start in franchise history.
 The Cavaliers and Warriors both started the NBA postseason with 8–0 records, the first time in NBA history that two teams started 8–0 in the same postseason since switching to a seven-game format.
 In a series-ending 114–75 loss against the Spurs, the Houston Rockets set an NBA record for fewest two-point field goals made in a game. They made 9 of 37, while the previous record was 11 of 41.

Conference finals
 After trailing as much as 25 points, Golden State Warriors came back and won against the San Antonio Spurs in Game 1. This is the second largest comeback in the Conference Finals since the Celtics came back from 26 to beat the Nets in Game 3 of the 2002 Eastern Conference Finals.
 With a 36-point win against the San Antonio Spurs in Game 2, this is the Golden State Warriors' 2nd largest margin of victory in postseason history. (The largest is 39-point set back in 1948, which would be surpassed in the following year when the Warriors defeat Rockets by 41.)
 After trailing as much as 21 points, the Boston Celtics surged back with a 28–10 third quarter run against the Cleveland Cavaliers to win Game 3. This was also the Cavaliers' first loss this postseason, as well as their first loss in a postseason game since Game 4 of the previous year's Finals, snapping an NBA playoff record tying 13 game winning streak.
 With a four-game sweep against the San Antonio Spurs, the Golden State Warriors earned the distinction of having a 12–0 postseason record, the first in NBA history. They are also the first team to have 3 best-of-7 series sweeps, and join the 1988-89 Los Angeles Lakers (who ironically, would get swept themselves by the Detroit Pistons) and the 2000-01 Lakers as the only teams to be undefeated going into the championship round, and the only one to have done it under the 7-7-7-7 format since it was introduced in 2003.

NBA Finals
The Golden State Warriors began the finals with a playoff record of 12–0. The first two finals' games were blowouts by Golden State, game three was closer, but the Warriors still came out victors, going up 3–0 bringing them to 15–0 in the playoffs, the best ever start in NBA playoff history. The Cavs countered beating the Warriors 137–116 in Game four, with 86 points in the first half, setting an NBA Finals' record. On June 12, the Warriors bounced back and won game five at home 129-120, clinching the organization's fifth championship. Golden State's 16–1 record is an NBA playoff record since 2003 for fewest games attempted to achieve an NBA championship. The title was all-star forward Kevin Durant's first and all-stars Stephen Curry's, Klay Thompson's, and Draymond Green's second in three years. Durant, who scored over 30 points in each of five games (the first player to do so since Shaquille O'Neal in 2000 with Los Angeles), was the recipient of the 2017 Bill Russell NBA Finals' MVP award.

Format

Within each conference, the eight teams with the most wins qualify for the playoffs. The seedings are based on each team's record.

Each conference's bracket is fixed; there is no reseeding. All rounds are best-of-seven series; the team that has four wins advances to the next round. As stated above, all rounds, including the NBA Finals, are in a 2–2–1–1–1 format. Home court advantage in any round belongs to the higher-seeded team, who has the better regular season record. If two teams with the same record meet in a round, standard tiebreaker rules are used. The rule for determining home court advantage in the NBA Finals is winning percentage, then head-to-head record, followed by record vs. opposite conference.

Playoff qualifying
The Cleveland Cavaliers became the first Eastern Conference team to clinch a playoff spot on March 19, 2017.

Eastern Conference

Western Conference

Bracket
Teams in bold advanced to the next round. The numbers to the left of each team indicate the team's seeding in its conference, and the numbers to the right indicate the number of games the team won in that round. The division champions are marked by an asterisk. Teams with home court advantage are shown in Italics.

First round
All times are in Eastern Daylight Time (UTC−04:00)

Eastern Conference first round

(1) Boston Celtics vs. (8) Chicago Bulls

After trailing 2-0 in the series, the Celtics came back to tie the series as Rajon Rondo was ruled out indefinitely after breaking his right thumb in Game 2, and Al Horford scored 18 points and grabbed 8 rebounds in Game 3, and Isaiah Thomas scorched the Bulls for 33 points in Game 4. The Celtics' win in Game 5 would be the only home game victory of the series, and Avery Bradley scored 23 points in Game 6 as the Celtics eliminated the Bulls. Notably, this series began one day following the death of Chyna Thomas, younger sister of Isaiah, in a one-car accident. Thomas played all six games of the series, before returning to the state of Washington for her funeral on April 29. Game 6 also marked the final game of Jimmy Butler's tenure as a Bull.

This was the fifth playoff meeting between these two teams, with the Celtics winning the first four meetings.

(2) Cleveland Cavaliers vs. (7) Indiana Pacers

In Game 1, LeBron James scored 32 points in a close battle; the Pacers came back in the 4th quarter, but C.J. Miles missed a game-winning three, giving the Cavaliers the win. But after winning Game 2, the Cavs were down by as many as 26 points in the first half of Game 3. The Pacers were in control until the Cavs led by James' triple-double of 41 points, 13 rebounds and 12 assists came roaring back in the second half and took the lead late in the fourth quarter. They would end up winning Game 3, 119-114, as they made it one of the largest comebacks in NBA playoff history. With the Pacers holding a 2-point lead with over a minute left in Game 4, James hits the three over Myles Turner, giving the Cavs a one-point lead. Later, Kyle Korver's free throws increases the lead to three. The Pacers had a chance to extend the game, but Paul George missed the three, and James gets the rebound. He would make 1 of the 2 free throws to seal the Cavs' 4-game sweep over the Pacers. Game 4 would be George's final game as a Pacer.

This was the second playoff meeting between these two teams, with the Pacers winning the first meeting.

(3) Toronto Raptors vs. (6) Milwaukee Bucks

This was the first meeting in the playoffs between the Raptors and Bucks.

(4) Washington Wizards vs. (5) Atlanta Hawks

This was the sixth playoff meeting between these two teams, with the Wizards/Bullets winning three of the first five meetings.

Western Conference first round

(1) Golden State Warriors vs. (8) Portland Trail Blazers

This was the second playoff meeting between these two teams, with Golden State winning the first meeting in 2016.

(2) San Antonio Spurs vs. (7) Memphis Grizzlies

In game 4, Marc Gasol hits the game winning shot with 0.7 seconds left in overtime.

This was the fifth playoff meeting between these two teams, with San Antonio winning three of the four meetings.

(3) Houston Rockets vs. (6) Oklahoma City Thunder

This was the eighth playoff meeting between these two teams, with the Thunder/SuperSonics winning six of the first seven meetings.

(4) Los Angeles Clippers vs. (5) Utah Jazz

In Game 1, Joe Johnson hits the game-winner at the buzzer.

 Game 7 is Paul Pierce's final NBA game. It is also Chris Paul's final game with the Clippers before being traded to the Rockets during the offseason.

This was the third playoff meeting between these two teams, with the Jazz winning the previous two meetings.

Conference semifinals

(1) Boston Celtics vs. (4) Washington Wizards 

 In Game 6, John Wall hit the game-winning 3-pointer with 3.5 seconds left.

This was the fourth playoff meeting between these two teams, with the Celtics winning two of the first three meetings. Memorably, during the first quarter of Game 1, Isaiah Thomas was struck in the mouth by the elbow of Otto Porter, immediately knocking out one tooth, and causing further damage to his mouth. As Porter prepared to shoot a pair of free throws, Thomas calmly retrieved and pocketed his fallen tooth, then hit two three-point field goals in the following two minutes, before being pulled from the game for medical attention. Thomas went on to play the entire seven-game series, including a 53-point effort to lead his team to an overtime victory in game 2, all while wearing temporary protection in his mouth. He underwent extensive oral surgery after the playoffs to mitigate the damage.

(2) Cleveland Cavaliers vs. (3) Toronto Raptors 

This was the second playoff meeting between these two teams, with Cleveland winning the first meeting in 2016.

Western Conference semifinals

(1) Golden State Warriors vs. (5) Utah Jazz

 This was Gordon Hayward's last game in Utah as he joined the Boston Celtics during the following offseason.

This was the fourth playoff meeting between these two teams, with the Warriors winning two of the first three meetings.

(2) San Antonio Spurs vs. (3) Houston Rockets

 In Game 5, Manu Ginóbili blocked James Harden's game-tying 3-point attempt in overtime before the buzzer sounded.

This was the fourth playoff meeting between these two teams, with the Rockets winning the first three meetings.

Conference finals

Eastern Conference finals

(1) Boston Celtics vs. (2) Cleveland Cavaliers

 This was Isaiah Thomas' last game in Boston as a hip injury would not allow him to dress for the remainder of the playoffs. He and teammate Jae Crowder would be traded to the Cavaliers during the following offseason.

 In Game 3, Avery Bradley hit the game-winning three-pointer with 0.1 seconds left.

This was the seventh playoff meeting between these two teams, with the Celtics winning four of the first six meetings.

Western Conference finals

(1) Golden State Warriors vs. (2) San Antonio Spurs

This was the third playoff meeting between these two teams, with each team winning one series. San Antonio led by as many as 25 points in Game 1 before Kawhi Leonard had to leave the game and the series after he landed on Zaza Pachulia's foot, re-aggravating his existing ankle injury.

2017 NBA Finals: (E2) Cleveland Cavaliers vs. (W1) Golden State Warriors

This was the third meeting in the NBA Finals between the Warriors and Cavaliers with each team winning one series.

Statistical leaders

Media coverage

Television
ESPN, TNT, ABC, ESPN2 and  NBA TV broadcast the playoffs nationally in the United States. In the first round, regional sports networks affiliated with the teams can also broadcast the games, except for games televised on ABC. Throughout the first two rounds, TNT televised games Saturday through Thursday, ESPN televised games Friday and Saturday, and ABC televised selected games on Saturday and Sunday, usually in the afternoon. NBA TV and ESPN2 has aired select weekday games in the first round. TNT televised the Eastern Conference Finals.  Game 1 of the Western Conference Finals was televised on ABC, while Games 2 through 4 were televised on ESPN.  ABC had exclusive television rights to the NBA Finals for the 15th consecutive year.

References

External links

 Basketball – Reference.com's 2017 Playoffs section

Playoffs
National Basketball Association playoffs
ABS-CBN television specials